EARC may refer to:

 East African Railways Corporation
 Eastern Association of Rowing Colleges
 Electoral and Administrative Review Commission, a former government agency in Queensland, Australia
 Electronic Advance Reader Copy, an electronic format book for pre-publishing readers to review
 Enhanced Audio Return Channel (eARC), part of the HDMI specification